Mohamed Said Fazul (born 18 September 1960) was president of the Comorian island of Mohéli from 19 May 2002 to 1 July 2007.

He worked as a pharmacist and taught natural sciences at a Fomboni college until his nomination by President Azali Assoumani in March 2001 to be governor of Mohéli. He benefited from his incumbent position as island governor and the backing of Azali in beating his rival, Mohamed Hassanaly, in the second round of the elections for the presidency of Mohéli on 7 April 2002, although Hassanally had received more votes in the first round.

After two rounds of elections in June 2007, he was defeated by Mohamed Ali Said, who took office on 1 July.

References

1960 births
Candidates for President of the Comoros
Living people
People from Mohéli